Ma Weichao (born 12 January 1997) is a Chinese footballer who plays for  Shenzhen Bogang.

Club career
Ma Weichao started his professional football career in August 2016 when he was loaned to Hong Kong Premier League side R&F, which was the satellite team of Guangzhou R&F. He made his senior league debut on 20 November 2016 in a 2–0 home defeat against Kitchee.

Career statistics
Statistics accurate as of match played 6 May 2017.

1League Cups include Hong Kong Senior Challenge Shield, Hong Kong League Cup and Hong Kong Sapling Cup.

References

1997 births
Living people
People from Zhanjiang
Association football defenders
Chinese footballers
Footballers from Zhanjiang
R&F (Hong Kong) players
Hong Kong Premier League players